Microtis orbicularis, commonly known as the dark mignonette orchid, is a species of orchid endemic to southern Australia. It has a single thin, more or less hollow, onion-like leaf and up to fifty small yellowish-green and red flowers. The plants grow in winter-wet areas, often in shallow water and unlike the similar M. cupularis do not turn black as they dry.

Description
Flowering occurs from September to December.

Taxonomy and naming
The dark mignonette orchid was first formally described in 1907 by Richard Sanders Rogers from a specimen collected from a swamp near Myponga. In 2002, David Jones and Garry Brockman changed the name to Hydrorchis cupularis but the change has not been accepted by the World Checklist of Selected Plant Families. The specific epithet (orbicularis) is a Latin word meaning "orbicular" or "having the form of a small circle", referring to the shape of the labellum.

Distribution and habitat
Microtis orbicularis grows in swamps and seasonally wet depressions, sometimes with the base of the plant submerged. It is found between Dongara and Cape Le Grand in Western Australia, in coastal areas of eastern South Australia as far west as the Eyre Peninsula, in the south-west of Victoria and on the north coast of Tasmania.

Conservation
Microtis orbicularis is classified as "not threatened" in Western Australia by the Western Australian Government Department of Parks and Wildlife.

References

orbicularis
Endemic orchids of Australia
Orchids of Western Australia
Plants described in 1907